Cyperus debilissimus is a species of sedge that is native to parts of Madagascar.

See also 
 List of Cyperus species

References 

debilissimus
Taxa named by John Gilbert Baker
Plants described in 1887
Endemic flora of Madagascar